Zirconolite is a mineral, calcium zirconium titanate; formula CaZrTi2O7.  Some examples of the mineral may also contain thorium, uranium, cerium, niobium and iron; the presence of  thorium or  uranium would make the mineral radioactive. It is black or brown in color.

References

Calcium minerals
Zirconium minerals
Titanium minerals
Oxide minerals